The Silent War is a 2012 Chinese-Hong Kong thriller film directed by Alan Mak and Felix Chong. It is an adaptation of the popular novel Plot Against written by Mai Jia.

The story is about a recruit with extrasensory perception working for a government unit tasked with stopping an "invisible enemy". The film deals with spies, subterfuge and hidden romance.

The film won Best Cinematography at the 32nd Hong Kong Film Award.

Cast
Tony Leung Chiu-Wai as He Bing 
Zhou Xun as Zhang Xue Ning
Mavis Fan as Shen Jing 
Wang Xue Bing as Guo Xingzhong
Dong Yong as Wu Chang
Carrie Ng as Mrs Li
Pal Sinn as Luo Saner
Lam Wai as Captain Yang
Tang Qun as Mother He
Jacob Cheung as Sparrow
Zhang Haiyan as Mrs. Ma

Awards and nominations
32nd Hong Kong Film Awards
 Nominated: Best Screenplay (Alan Mak & Felix Chong)
 Nominated: Best Actor (Tony Leung Chiu-Wai)
 Nominated: Best Actress (Zhou Xun)
 Nominated: Best Supporting Actress (Mavis Fan)
 Won: Best Cinematography (Anthony Pun Yiu Ming)
 Nominated: Best Art Direction (Man Lim Chung)
 Nominated: Best Costume & Make Up Design (Man Lim Chung)
 Nominated: Best Original Film Score (Chan Kwong Wing)

Golden Horse Awards
 Nominated: Best Art Direction (Man Lim Chung)
 Nominated: Best Makeup & Costume Design (Man Lim Chung)
 Nominated: Best Sound Effects (Traithep Wongpaiboon, Nopawat Likitwong)
 Nominated: Best Supporting Actress (Mavis Fan)

Asian Film Awards
 Won: Best Costume Designer (Man Lim Chung)
 Nominated: Best Production Designer (Man Lim Chung)

Asia Pacific Film Awards
 Won: Best Sound Effects (Traithep Wongpaiboon, Nopawat Likitwong)

Huading Awards
'''Won: Best Supporting Actress (Mavis Fan)

References

External links
 

2012 films
2012 crime thriller films
Chinese crime thriller films
Hong Kong crime thriller films
Films directed by Alan Mak
Films directed by Felix Chong
Films set in the 1950s
2010s Mandarin-language films
2010s Hong Kong films